Edward "Ned" Price (born November 22, 1982) is an American political advisor and former intelligence officer serving as spokesman for the United States Department of State since 2021. He worked at the Central Intelligence Agency (CIA) from 2006 until 2017. 

In February 2017, Price published a controversial op-ed piece in The Washington Post, outlining his decision to retire from the CIA rather than work in the Trump administration.

Early life and education
Price grew up in Dallas, where he graduated from St. Mark's School of Texas. He was a contributing member of The ReMarker and remains involved with their annual campouts in a supervisory role. He then graduated summa cum laude from Georgetown University, where he studied international relations at the School of Foreign Service. He reportedly chose this field of study in anticipation of joining the CIA after graduation. He later earned a master's degree from Harvard University's Kennedy School of Government.

Career

Early in his career, Price worked as an intelligence analyst. His focus was on the detection and disruption of possible terrorist attacks against the United States and its interests. In 2013, Mother Jones quoted Price defending the CIA financing research on climate change, in the face of opposition from Republican lawmakers who had described the CIA unit as "a waste of resources" and "spying on sea lions". Later in his CIA career, he was loaned to the National Security Council, serving as its spokesperson and as a Special Assistant to President Barack Obama. Price discusses his experiences working under President Obama in West Wingers: Stories from the Dream Chasers, Change Makers, and Hope Creators Inside the Obama White House (2018).

Price is a Co-Founder and previously served as Director of Policy and Communications at National Security Action, a 501(c)(4) registered lobby group along with several former Obama national security advisors.

Op-ed piece
In a February 2017 Washington Post op-ed piece, Price described mounting concerns over Donald Trump, first when he was candidate, then prior to inauguration, and then as the sitting president. Price described his initial concern when Trump blithely dismissed the opinions of senior intelligence officials during a debate with rival candidate Hillary Clinton. Price then described how demoralized he and fellow CIA officials felt when newly inaugurated President Trump used a visit to CIA headquarters for campaign-style self-promotion. Finally, Price reflected on how Trump removed senior intelligence officials from the "principal's committee", and expressed concern that by ignoring their advice he was putting public safety at risk.

In his op-ed, Price had pointed out that he had loyally served in both Republican and Democratic administrations.

Concerns related to Jared Kushner
In an article published in Politico on July 14, 2017, Price expressed concerns related to the appointment and continued hold of a security clearance of President Trump's son-in-law Jared Kushner. In the article, Price reviewed the extensive vetting that he had experienced to gain a security clearance, which lasted approximately a year, and compared that to the security clearance granted to Kushner. Discussing the disclosures of the developing information related to Kushner's apparent involvement in a Russian interference in the 2016 United States presidential election, Price said: "I am confident in saying that my clearance would have been immediately revoked had I, as a career CIA officer, been accused of a fraction of these activities."

Biden administration 
On January 20, 2021, Price assumed office as the Spokesperson for the United States Department of State in the Biden administration; he is the first openly gay person in this post.

In March 2021, Price stated that the U.S. has "serious concerns" about the International Criminal Court's (ICC) investigation into war crimes committed during the 2014 War in Gaza. Price stated that the ICC has "no jurisdiction over this matter" and is "unfairly" targeting Israel, His statement is consistent with Trump's executive order 13928, which denies the jurisdiction of ICC over the United States and its allies.

In February 2022, Price engaged with a journalist over the Biden administration's claims about Ukraine. In the exchange, which was widely circulated, Price said that Russia was planning to stage an attack as a pretext for war; he provided no evidence to support the assertion, despite multiple questions from a veteran Associated Press reporter. On February 24, 2022, Russia invaded Ukraine after a series of attempted pretexts.

Personal life 
Price is the son of Martin Lewis Price and Elizabeth Sarah Reger.

Price is openly gay and Jewish, though he rarely attends synagogue.

References

External links

1982 births
Biden administration personnel
Gay politicians
Harvard Kennedy School alumni
LGBT appointed officials in the United States
Living people
MSNBC people
NBC News people
Obama administration personnel
People from Dallas
People of the Central Intelligence Agency
St. Mark's School (Texas) alumni
United States Department of State spokespeople
United States National Security Council staffers
Walsh School of Foreign Service alumni
21st-century American LGBT people
American gay men
Gay Jews
21st-century American Jews